Louder Than Love is the second studio album by American Latin freestyle group TKA, released by Tommy Boy Records on August 15, 1990.  It was released on CD, LP and cassette.  Unlike its predecessor, Scars of Love, this album failed to chart on the U.S. Billboard magazine Top Pop Albums chart, and received a weaker review (retrospectively) by AllMusic's Alex Henderson. Four singles were released, three of which charted on the Billboard Hot 100 singles chart.

The song "You Are the One", was released before Louder Than Love in 1989 to promote the film Lean on Me, as the song was featured on the soundtrack album.  The song reached position 91 on the Billboard Hot 100 in June 1989.  In 1990, the singles "I Won't Give Up on You" and "Crash (Have Some Fun)" (the latter credited to "TKA featuring Michelle Visage") reached the No.65 and No.80 respectively.  The final single, "Louder Than Love" got to No.62 on the Billboard Hot 100 in October 1991.

Track listing

Charts
Singles - Billboard (North America)

Notes 

1990 albums
TKA albums
Tommy Boy Records albums